Erqi District is one of 6 urban districts of the prefecture-level city of Zhengzhou, the capital of Henan Province, South Central China.

Administrative divisions
As 2012, this district is divided to 6 subdistricts, 1 town and 1 township.
Subdistricts

Towns
Mazhai

Townships
Houzhai Township

Tourist attractions
 Erqi Memorial Tower
 Xiaolou Mosque

References

External links
Official website of Erqi District Government

Districts of Zhengzhou